Loose is a surname. Notable people with the surname include:

Emmy Loose (1914–1987), Austrian opera singer
Julian Loose (born 1985), German footballer
Ralf Loose (born 1963), German footballer and manager
Thomas Loose (born 1964), West-German slalom canoeist
William Loose (1910–1991), American composer

Surnames from given names